Shenfield railway station is on the Great Eastern Main Line in the East of England, serving the town of Shenfield, Essex. Its three-letter station code is SNF.

The station was opened in 1843 and has since expanded from its original three platforms to the current six.

History

Shenfield station was opened by the Eastern Counties Railway company on 29 March 1843 on the extension from Brentwood to Colchester. As it was situated in a rural area, patronage was low, so it was closed in March 1850. It reopened with the name Shenfield & Hutton Junction on 1 January 1887 under the Great Eastern Railway to serve as an interchange station with the new line to Southend that was completed two years later. There were three platforms, two up (London-bound) and one down (country-bound). Under the London and North Eastern Railway, two extra tracks for terminating local (suburban "metro") trains opened in 1934, resulting in five platforms.

The 1920 survey of the station shows goods sidings and a turntable on the London side of the up platforms. The goods yard was closed on 4 May 1964 and it became the station's car park. The Hutton Junction suffix in the station's name was removed on 20 February 1969.

Immediately west of the station is Brentwood bank, which descends steeply in the up (London) direction. This bank presented a significant climb to steam trains. There are extensive sidings on the London side of the station just before the start of the descent down the bank.

To the east of the station, the lines for Southend diverge to the south. West of Shenfield there are five tracks, but to the east these split, two towards  and two towards . The London and North Eastern Railway opened the Southend Loop to the east of the station on 1 January 1934. This enabled Southend trains to and from platforms 4 and 5 to dive-under the main line thus eliminating conflicting movements. The bi-directional loop line connects to the Southend line at Mountnessing Junction.

The lines from London Liverpool Street and London Fenchurch Street (via Gas Factory Junction and Bow Junction) to Shenfield were electrified at 1500 V DC overhead system in 1949. This was converted to 6.5 kV AC in 1960. Gidea Park to Shenfield was converted to 25 kV AC in 1976. Liverpool Street to Gidea Park was converted to 25 kV AC in 1980.

Oyster card readers were installed for pay-as-you-go journeys in 2013.

Today, Shenfield is served by fast trains on the main line towards London, and it is the north-eastern terminus of the Elizabeth line. At peak hours the frequency of service will increase from eight trains per hour to 12, necessitating the construction of a new 210-metre long platform 6, which was built to the north of platform 5, replacing one of the existing three western sidings. The two remaining western sidings and three new eastern sidings are also used by the Elizabeth line. Platforms 1 to 5 have an operational length for 12 carriages, platform 6 for 10 carriages.

Services
The typical off-peak service pattern at Shenfield is:

7 trains per hour (tph) to London Liverpool Street, of which:
5 call at Stratford and Liverpool Street,
2 call at Romford, Stratford and Liverpool Street
8 tph to Paddington calling at all stations on the Elizabeth line
3 tph to Southend Victoria, calling at all stations to Southend Victoria;
1 tph to Clacton-on-Sea, calling at Ingatestone, Chelmsford, Witham, Colchester, Wivenhoe, Thorpe-le-Soken and Clacton-on-Sea;
1 tph to Colchester Town, calling at Chelmsford, Witham then all stations to Colchester Town;
1 tph to Ipswich, calling at Chelmsford then all stations to Ipswich.

During peak times, service frequencies may be increased and calling patterns varied. Service frequencies are generally reduced on Sundays.

References

External links

 
 Excel file displaying National Rail station usage information for 2005/06

Railway stations in Essex
DfT Category B stations
Transport in the Borough of Brentwood
Former Great Eastern Railway stations
Greater Anglia franchise railway stations
Railway stations served by the Elizabeth line
William Neville Ashbee railway stations
Railway stations in Great Britain opened in 1843
Railway stations in Great Britain closed in 1850
Railway stations in Great Britain opened in 1887